El Ouldja may refer to the following places in Algeria:

El Ouldja, Relizane
El Ouldja, Sétif